Extraordinary repatriation is the return of persons to their country without going through the government of that country.

See also
Extraordinary rendition

Central Intelligence Agency operations
Emergency laws
International law
Counterterrorism in the United States